Stempfferia uniformis, the Ikoyi epitola, is a butterfly in the family Lycaenidae. It is found in Nigeria and possibly Cameroon and the Democratic Republic of the Congo. The habitat consists of forests.

References

Butterflies described in 1887
Poritiinae
Butterflies of Africa
Taxa named by William Forsell Kirby